Nayantha Weeraman (born 12 November 1977) is a Sri Lankan former cricketer. He played in 45 first-class and 21 List A matches between 1998/99 and 2006/07. He made his Twenty20 debut on 17 August 2004, for Tamil Union Cricket and Athletic Club in the 2004 SLC Twenty20 Tournament.

References

External links
 

1977 births
Living people
Sri Lankan cricketers
Galle Cricket Club cricketers
Tamil Union Cricket and Athletic Club cricketers
Place of birth missing (living people)